Quşçu is a settlement and municipality in the Dashkasan Rayon of Azerbaijan. It has a population of 745.  The municipality consists of the settlement of Quşçu and the village of Quşçu Körpüsü.

References

Populated places in Dashkasan District